Bill Maher is an American comedian and commentator

He is most known for his ABC series Politically Incorrect (1993-2002) and his HBO series Real Time with Bill Maher (2003–present).

He received 41 Primetime Emmy Award nominations for his work on Politically Incorrect and Real Time with Bill Maher winning in 2013 for Outstanding Informational Series or Special for Vice in 2014. He also received two Grammy Awards for Outstanding Spoken Word Album for When You Ride Alone You Ride with bin Laden in 2004 and New Rules: Polite Musings from a Timid Observer in 2007. He has also received thirteen Producers Guild of America Award nominations and fifteen Writers Guild of America Award nominations.

In 2010, Maher received a Star on the Hollywood Walk of Fame.

Major associations

Emmy Awards

Grammy Awards

Tony Award

Industry awards

Producers Guild of America Awards

Writers Guild of America Awards

References 

Maher, Bill